Waterford is an unincorporated village and census-designated place (CDP) in the Catoctin Valley of Loudoun County, Virginia, located along Catoctin Creek. The entire village and surrounding countryside is a National Historic Landmark District, noted for its well-preserved 18th and 19th-century character.

In the 1810 United States Census, the population center of the United States was recorded as being just northwest of the village.

History

Founding 
Waterford was established around 1733 by Amos Janney, a Quaker from Bucks County, Pennsylvania. Janney purchased  on the south fork of Catoctin Creek and established a grist mill and saw mill in the area in the 1740s. Due to the success of the mills, the settlement became known as "Janney's Mill." The town grew quickly as a center of commerce for growers of grain.

Growth
Amos Janney died in 1747, leaving his estate to his sixteen-year-old son, Mahlon, who replaced the original log mill with a two-story structure. The village continued to grow, and in 1780,  on the south side of Main Street were subdivided into 15 lots, upon which shops and homes were built. By the 1790s, the village was known as "Waterford", named after the city of Waterford in Ireland, where some of its founders had once lived before immigrating to the United States. New residents continued to come from Pennsylvania, as Quakers were followed by Presbyterians, Lutherans, Baptists, and Methodists. Waterford was also populated by African-Americans, both free and enslaved.

Civil War
By the start of the Civil War, the population of Waterford remained largely Quaker. As pacifists and abolitionists, the Quakers remained loyal to the Union throughout the war. Waterford was the scene of a fierce fight between the county's Unionist and Confederate partisan units, the Loudoun Rangers and White's Rebels, respectively. In those days, it was the home for mostly Quakers who helped slaves escape to the North.

Waterford today 
With the town falling into disrepair in the early part of the 20th century, the Waterford Foundation was formed to help save and preserve Waterford and its history. In 1974, the Waterford Foundation helped create an innovative land preservation program in which the historic properties of Waterford are protected through open space and façade easements. More than 60 easements have been granted.

The town today is largely residential, although a number of businesses are based in the village. The Loudoun Mutual Insurance Company has been located in Waterford since 1849.

National Historic Landmark
The village was listed as a Virginia Historic Landmark in 1969. Waterford and a significant portion of its surrounding countryside were declared a National Historic Landmark in 1970.  Waterford and its surrounding 1,400 acres were designated a National Historic Landmark, the highest designation of historic significance possible in the United States of America. This places the Waterford Historic District on the same level of significance as Independence Hall, Mount Vernon and Colonial Williamsburg. The designation was made in recognition of the town's well-preserved 18th and 19th-century architecture and landscape. Significant buildings include the mill (circa 1750), Arch House Row (circa 1750), Camelot School (circa 1800), the Hague-Hough house, which is Waterford's oldest house (circa 1740), and the 1882 Presbyterian church.

The Catoctin Creek Bridge was listed on the National Register of Historic Places in 1974, and the William Virts House was listed in 2011.

See also
List of National Historic Landmarks in Virginia
National Register of Historic Places listings in Loudoun County, Virginia

References

External links

Waterford Citizens' Association
Waterford Foundation
Waterford history
Waterford, Virginia: From Mill Town to National Historic Landmark,  a National Park Service Teaching with Historic Places (TwHP) lesson plan
Waterford Historic District map at Virginia DHR
Waterford Historic District, Loudoun County, 4 photos at Virginia DHR
, and about 39 other records for individual structures

Historic districts on the National Register of Historic Places in Virginia
Unincorporated communities in Loudoun County, Virginia
Former municipalities in Virginia
Unincorporated communities in Virginia
Census-designated places in Loudoun County, Virginia
Census-designated places in Virginia
Washington metropolitan area
National Historic Landmarks in Virginia
Protected areas of Loudoun County, Virginia
Georgian architecture in Virginia
Federal architecture in Virginia
National Register of Historic Places in Loudoun County, Virginia
Historic American Buildings Survey in Virginia